Fort Armstrong, Hawaii was a Coast Artillery Fort built in 1907 and named after Brigadier General Samuel C. Armstrong.  Army Corps of Engineers were still at the Fort until 1974.

History
Fort Armstrong is located at Honolulu, Oahu and was built on fill over Ku-akau-kukui reef in 1907 to protect Honolulu harbor. It had one named Battery, and was spread over 64 Acres.

 Battery Tiernon with two pedestal mounted 3-inch M1903 guns from 1911 to 1943. 
The original garrison was the 1st Coast artillery Company followed by the  104th Mine Co. operating the harbor mines. Also stationed there was the 185th Coast Artillery Company. Fort Armstrong continued under the occupation of the Coast Artillery until September 15, 1922, when the Coast Artillery Headquarters moved to Fort De Russy 
it was abandoned by the U.S. Army by 1950 and is now part of a container port facility.

See also
 U.S. Army Coast Artillery Corps
 Mine Planter Service (U.S. Army)
 16th Coast Artillery (United States)

References

 https://web.archive.org/web/20110816235445/http://www.pod.usace.army.mil/Photo%20Gallery/podphoto.html
 
 place names 
 http://itouchmap.com/?d=1953656&s=HI&f=military
 https://web.archive.org/web/20100125221718/http://www.cdsg.org/hawaii.htm
 Hawaii past and present 
 Congressional record 
 executive order 
 land transfers 
 Fortifications Bill 1920

External links
 film of pier 
 Coast Artillery Companies 

Geography of Honolulu
Museums in Honolulu
Military and war museums in Hawaii
Armstrong
Buildings and structures in Honolulu
Coastal artillery
National Register of Historic Places in Honolulu